Alkis Thrylos (Greek: Άλκης Θρύλος, born Eleni Ourani (Ελένης Ουράνη) in 1896 – December 8, 1971) was a Greek writer.  She was a member of the Negreponti (Νεγρεπόντη) family.  She was a critic of literature of the theatre.  Her husband was the poet Kostas Ouranis. She died on December 8, 1971.

References

Attribution
This article is a translation of Greek Wikipedia's article Άλκης Θρύλος

1896 births
1971 deaths
19th-century Greek women
20th-century Greek women writers
Writers from Athens